Anamorphic format is the cinematography technique of shooting a widescreen picture on standard 35 mm film or other visual recording media with a non-widescreen native aspect ratio. It also refers to the projection format in which a distorted image is "stretched" by an anamorphic projection lens to recreate the original aspect ratio on the viewing screen (not to be confused with anamorphic widescreen, a different video encoding concept that uses similar principles but different means). The word anamorphic and its derivatives stem from the Greek  ("to transform"), compound of morphé ("form, shape") with the prefix  ("back, against"). In the late 1990s and 2000s, anamorphic lost popularity in comparison to "flat" (or "spherical") formats such as Super 35 with the advent of digital intermediates; however, in the years since digital cinema cameras and projectors have become commonplace, anamorphic has experienced a considerable resurgence of popularity, due in large part to the higher base ISO sensitivity of digital sensors, which facilitates shooting at smaller apertures.

History
The process of anamorphosing optics was developed by Henri Chrétien during World War I to provide a wide angle viewer for military tanks. The optical process was called Hypergonar by Chrétien and was capable of showing a field of view of 180 degrees. After the war, the technology was first used in a cinematic context in the short film To Build a Fire (based on the 1908 Jack London story of the same name) in 1927 by Claude Autant-Lara.

In the 1920s, phonograph and motion picture pioneer Leon F. Douglass also created special effects and anamorphic widescreen motion picture cameras. However, how this relates to the earlier French invention, and later development, is unclear.

Anamorphic widescreen was not used again for cinematography until 1952 when Twentieth Century-Fox bought the rights to the technique to create its CinemaScope widescreen technique. CinemaScope was one of many widescreen formats developed in the 1950s to compete with the popularity of television and bring audiences back to the cinemas. The Robe, which premiered in 1953, was the first feature film released that was filmed with an anamorphic lens.

Development
The introduction of anamorphic widescreen arose from a desire for wider aspect ratios that maximized overall image detail (compared to other widescreen formats, not compared to fullscreen) while retaining the use of standard (4 perf per frame) cameras and projectors. The modern anamorphic format has an aspect ratio of 2.39:1, meaning the (projected) picture's width is 2.39 times its height, (this is sometimes approximated to 2.4:1). The older Academy format Anamorphic widescreen was a response to a shortcoming in the non-anamorphic spherical (a.k.a. "flat") widescreen format. With a non-anamorphic lens, the picture is recorded onto the film negative such that its full width fits within the film's frame, but not its full height. A substantial part of the frame area is thereby wasted, being occupied (on the negative) by a portion of the image which is subsequently matted-out (i.e. masked, either on the print or in the projector) and so not projected, in order to create the widescreen image.

To increase overall image detail, by using all the available area of the negative for only that portion of the image which will be projected, an anamorphic lens is used during photography to compress the image horizontally, thereby filling the full (4 perf) frame's area with the portion of the image that corresponds to the area projected in the non-anamorphic format. Up to the early 1960s, three major methods of anamorphosing the image were used: counter-rotated prisms (e.g. Ultra Panavision), curved mirrors in combination with the principle of total internal reflection (e.g. Technirama), and cylindrical lenses (lenses curved, hence squeezing the image being photographed, in only one direction, as with a cylinder, e.g. the original CinemaScope system based on Henri Chrétien's design). Regardless of method, the anamorphic lens projects a horizontally squeezed image on the film negative. This deliberate geometric distortion is then reversed on projection, resulting in a wider aspect ratio on-screen than that of the negative's frame.

Equipment
An anamorphic lens consists of a regular spherical lens, plus an anamorphic attachment (or an integrated lens element) that does the anamorphosing. The anamorphic element operates at infinite focal length, so that it has little or no effect on the focus of the primary lens it's mounted on but still anamorphoses (distorts) the optical field. A cameraman using an anamorphic attachment uses a spherical lens of a different focal length than they would use for Academy format (i.e. one sufficient to produce an image the full height of the frame and twice its width), and the anamorphic attachment squeezes the image (in the horizontal plane only) to half-width. Other anamorphic attachments existed (that were relatively rarely used) which would expand the image in the vertical dimension (e.g. in the early Technirama system mentioned above), so that (in the case of the common 2-times anamorphic lens) a frame twice as high as it might have been filled the available film area. In either case, since a larger film area recorded the same picture the image quality was improved.

The distortion (horizontal compression) introduced in the camera must be corrected when the film is projected, so another lens is used in the projection booth that restores the picture back to its correct proportions (or, in the case of the now obsolete Technirama system, squeezes the image vertically) to restore normal geometry. The picture is not manipulated in any way in the dimension that is perpendicular to the one anamorphosed.

It may seem that it would be easier to simply use a wider film for recording movies. However, since 35 mm film was already in widespread use, it was more economically feasible for film producers and exhibitors to simply attach a special lens to the camera or projector, rather than invest in an entirely new film format, which would require new cameras, projectors, editing equipment and so forth.

Naming
Cinerama was an earlier attempt to solve the problem of high-quality widescreen imaging, but anamorphic widescreen eventually proved more practical. Cinerama (which had an aspect ratio of 2.59:1) consisted of three simultaneously projected images side by side on the same screen. However, in practice the images never blended together perfectly at the edges. The system also suffered from various technical drawbacks, in that it required three projectors, a 6-perf-high frame, four times as much film, and three cameras (eventually simplified to just one camera with three lenses and three streaming reels of film and the attendant machinery), plus a host of synchronization problems. Nonetheless, the format was popular enough with audiences to trigger off the widescreen developments of the early 1950s. A few films were distributed in Cinerama format and shown in special theaters, but anamorphic widescreen was more attractive to the Studios since it could realize a similar aspect ratio and without the disadvantages of Cinerama's complexities and costs.

The anamorphic widescreen format in use today is commonly called 'Scope' (a contraction of the early term CinemaScope), or 2.35:1 (the latter being a misnomer born of old habit; see "Aspect ratio" section below). Filmed in Panavision is a phrase contractually required for films shot using Panavision's anamorphic lenses. All of these phrases mean the same thing: the final print uses a 2:1 anamorphic projector lens that expands the image by exactly twice the amount horizontally as vertically. This format is essentially the same as that of CinemaScope, except for some technical developments, such as the ability to shoot closeups without any facial distortion. (CinemaScope films seldom used full facial closeups, because of a condition known as CinemaScope mumps, which distorted faces as they got closer to the camera.)

Optical characteristics

There are artifacts that can occur when using an anamorphic camera lens that do not occur when using an ordinary spherical lens. One is a kind of lens flare that has a long horizontal line, usually with a blue tint, and is most often visible when there is a bright light in the frame, such as from car headlights, in an otherwise dark scene. This artifact is not always considered a problem, and even has become associated with a certain cinematic look, and often emulated using a special effect filter in scenes shot with a non-anamorphic lens. Another common aspect of anamorphic lenses is that light reflections within the lens are elliptical, rather than round as in ordinary cinematography. Additionally, wide-angle anamorphic lenses of less than 40 mm focal length produce a cylindrical perspective, which some directors and cinematographers, particularly Wes Anderson, use as a stylistic trademark.

Another characteristic of anamorphic lenses is that the cylindrical glass effectively creates two focal lengths within the lens. This results in out-of-focus points of light (called bokeh) appearing as vertical ovals rather than circles, as well as an increase in horizontal angle of view, both in proportion to the squeeze factor. A 50mm anamorphic lens with a 2x squeeze will have the horizontal view of a 25mm spherical lens, while maintaining the vertical view and depth of field of a 50mm. This has led to the common claim that anamorphic lenses have shallower focus, as the cinematographer must use a longer lens to obtain the same horizontal coverage.

A third characteristic, particularly of simple anamorphic add-on attachments, is "anamorphic mumps". For reasons of practical optics, the anamorphic squeeze is not uniform across the image field in any anamorphic system (whether cylindrical, prismatic or mirror-based). This variation results in some areas of the film image appearing more stretched than others. In the case of an actor's face, when positioned in the center of the screen faces look somewhat like they have the mumps, hence the name for the phenomenon. Conversely, at the edges of the screen actors in full-length view can become skinny-looking. In medium shots, if the actor walks across the screen from one side to the other, he will increase in apparent girth. Early CinemaScope presentations in particular (using Chrétien's off-the-shelf lenses) suffered from this. Panavision was the first company to produce an anti-mumps system in the late 1950s.

Panavision used a second lens (i.e. an add-on adapter) which was mechanically linked to the focus position of the primary lens. This changed the anamorphic ratio as the focus changed, resulting in the area of interest on-screen having a normal-looking geometry. Later cylindrical lens systems used, instead, two sets of anamorphic optics: one was a more robust "squeeze" system, which was coupled with a slight expansion sub-system. The expansion sub-system was counter-rotated in relation to the main squeeze system, all in mechanical interlinkage with the focus mechanism of the primary lens: this combination changed the anamorphic ratio and minimized the effect of anamorphic mumps in the area of interest in the frame. Although these techniques were regarded as a fix for anamorphic mumps, they were actually only a compromise. Cinematographers still had to frame scenes carefully to avoid the recognizable side-effects of the change in aspect ratio.

Recent use
Beginning in the 1990s, anamorphic began to lose popularity in favor of flat formats, mainly Super 35. (In Super 35, the film is shot flat, then matted, and optically printed as an anamorphic release print.) This was largely attributed to the artifacts, distortions, light requirements, and expenses (in comparison to its spherical counterpart), in the face of the rising use of digital visual effects. Moreover, with the advent of the digital intermediate in the 2000s, film grain became less of a concern with Super 35, as the optical intermediate/enlargement process could now be bypassed, eliminating two generations of potential quality loss (though an anamorphic negative, due to its size, still retained a higher definition widescreen image for mastering).

With the rise of digital cinematography, anamorphic photography has experienced something of a renaissance, as the higher light sensitivity (ISO) of digital sensors has lowered the lighting requirements that anamorphic lenses once demanded. Many vintage lens series, some of which saw little to no use for decades, have been sought by cinematographers wishing to add a more classic, film-like quality to digital cinematography; and manufacturers such as Panavision and Vantage have produced modern lenses using vintage glass for this purpose.

Emulation of anamorphic film has also been achieved in computer animation. One example of this is the animated series Star Wars: The Bad Batch by Lucasfilm Animation, which mimics the natural behavior of an anamorphic lens through simulated depth of field effects and a faux-film grain applied to the footage.

Aspect ratio  
One common misconception about the anamorphic format concerns the actual width number of the aspect ratio, as 2.35, 2.39 or 2.40. Since the anamorphic lenses in virtually all 35 mm anamorphic systems provide a 2:1 squeeze, one would logically conclude that a  full academy gate would lead to a  aspect ratio when used with anamorphic lenses. Due to differences in the camera gate aperture and projection aperture mask sizes for anamorphic films, however, the image dimensions used for anamorphic film vary from flat (spherical) counterparts. To complicate matters, the SMPTE standards for the format have varied over time; to further complicate things, pre-1957 prints took up the optical soundtrack space of the print (instead having magnetic sound on the sides), which made for a  ratio (ANSI PH22.104-1957).

The initial SMPTE definition for anamorphic projection with an optical sound track down the side ANSI PH22.106-1957 was issued in December 1957.

A new definition issued in June 1971 as ANSI PH22.106-1971. After unsqueezing, this would yield an aspect ratio of c. .
Four-perf anamorphic prints use more of the negative's available frame area than any other modern format, which leaves little room for splices. As a consequence, a bright line flashed onscreen when a splice was projected, and theater projectionists had been narrowing the vertical aperture to hide these flashes even before 1971.

The most recent revision, SMPTE 195-1993, was released in August 1993. It slightly altered the dimensions so as to standardize a common projection aperture width for all formats, anamorphic and flat. The camera's aperture remained the same ( or  if before 1958), only the height of the "negative assembly" splices changed and, consequently, the height of the frame changed.

Anamorphic prints are still often called 'Scope' or 2.35 by projectionists, cinematographers, and others working in the field, if only by force of habit. 2.39 is in fact what they generally are referring to (unless discussing films using the process between 1958 and 1970), which is itself usually rounded up to 2.40 (implying a false precision as compared to 2.4). With the exception of certain specialist and archivist areas, generally 2.35, 2.39 and 2.40 mean the same to professionals, whether they themselves are even aware of the changes or not.

Lens makers and corporate trademarks 

There are numerous companies that are known for manufacturing anamorphic lenses. The following are the most well known in the film industry:

Origination 
 Panavision is the most common source of anamorphic lenses, with lens series ranging from 20 mm to a 2,000 mm anamorphic telescope. The C-Series, which is the oldest lens series, are small and lightweight, which makes them very popular for steadicams. Some cinematographers prefer them to newer lenses because they are lower in contrast. The E-Series, of Nikon glass, are sharper than the C-Series and are better color-matched. They are also faster, but the minimum focus-distance of the shorter focal lengths is not as close. The E135mm, and especially the E180mm, are great close-up lenses with the closest minimum focus of any long Panavision anamorphic lenses. The Super (High) Speed lenses (1976), also by Nikon, are the fastest anamorphic lenses available, with T-stops between 1.4 and 1.8; there is even one T1.1 50mm, but, like all anamorphic lenses, they must be stopped-down for good performance because they are quite softly focused when wide open. The Primo and Close-Focus Primo Series (1989) are based on the spherical Primos and are the sharpest Panavision anamorphic lenses available. The G-Series (2007) performance and size comparable with E-Series, in lightweight and compact similar to C-Series. The T-Series (2016), Panavision's latest anamorphic lens series, is designed for digital cameras initially, but also film camera compatible through specific re-engineering at Panavision.
 Vantage Film, designers and manufacturers of Hawk lenses. The entire Hawk lens system consists of 50 different prime lenses and 5 zoom lenses, all of them specifically developed and optically computed by Vantage Film. Hawk lenses have their anamorphic element in the middle of the lens (not up front like Panavision), which makes them more flare-resistant. This design choice also means that if they do flare, one does not get the typical horizontal flares. The C-Series, which were developed in the mid-1990s, are relatively small and lightweight. The V-Series (2001) and V-Plus Series (2006) are an improvement over the C-Series as far as sharpness, contrast, barrel-distortion and close-focus are concerned. This increased optical performance means a higher weight, however (each lens is around ). There are 14 lenses in this series—from 25 mm to 250 mm. The V-Series also have the closest minimum focus of any anamorphic lens series available and as such can rival spherical lenses. Vantage also offers a series of lightweight lenses called V-Lite. They are 8 very small anamorphic lenses (about the size of a Cooke S4 spherical lens), which are ideal for handheld and Steadicam while also giving an optical performance comparable to the V-Series and V-Plus lenses. In 2008 Vantage introduced the Hawk V-Lite 16, a set of new lenses for 16 mm anamorphic production, as well as the Hawk V-Lite 1.3× lenses, which make it possible to use nearly the entire image area of 3-perf 35 mm film or the sensor area of a 16:9 digital camera and at the same time provide the popular 2.39:1 release format.
 Carl Zeiss AG and ARRI developed their Master Anamorphic lens line, debuted in September 2012, to provide minimum distortion and faster aperture at T1.9. These are spherical lenses with the anamorphic element at the rear, as opposed to third-party modified Zeiss-based anamorphics such as JDC and Technovision.
 Cooke Optics also developed their Anamorphic/i lens line, providing T2.3 aperture and color-matched with other Cooke lens lines, which is marketed as their "Cooke Look" feature. Like Zeiss, it's a totally new lens design which is different from third-party modified Cooke-based anamorphics such as JDC and Technovision. Cooke also developed its Anamorphic/i Full Frame Plus in 1.8× squeeze ratio for full frame cameras.
 Angenieux: Angenieux's first zoom for 35 mm film camera, the 35–140 mm, was equipped with a front anamorphic attachment built by Franscope. The 40-140 anamorphic was used on several Nouvelle Vague movies such Lola (1961) or Jules and Jim (1962). Panavision adapted the Angenieux 10× zoom for anamorphic productions. The 50-500 APZA was part of the standard anamorphic production package supported by Panavision from mid 1960s to the end of the 1970s. It has been used in numerous movies including The Graduate (1967), MASH (1970), McCabe and Mrs Miller (1971), Death in Venice (1971) and Jaws (1975). In 2013 and 2014 Angenieux released a new series of high end anamorphic zooms. These lenses, the 30-72 and 56-152 Optimo A2S are compact and weigh less than 2.5 kg.
 Joe Dunton Camera (JDC): A manufacturer and rental house based in Britain and North Carolina, which adapts spherical lenses to anamorphic by adding a cylindrical element. Its most popular lenses are the Xtal Xpres series (pronounced "Crystal Express"), which were built by Shiga Optical Co. in Japan from old Cooke S2/S3 and Panchro lenses. They have also adapted Zeiss Super Speeds and Standards (the Speedstar series), as well as Canon lenses. JDC was purchased by Panavision in 2007.
 Elite Optics, manufactured by JSC Optica-Elite Company in St. Petersburg, Russia and sold in the United States by Slow Motion Inc.
 Technovision, a French manufacturer that, like JDC, has adapted spherical Cooke and Zeiss lenses to anamorphic. Technovision was purchased by Panavision in 2004.
 Isco Optics, a German company that developed the Arriscope line for Arri in 1989.

Projection 
 ISCO Precision Optics is a manufacturer of theatrical cinema projection lenses.
 Panamorph is a manufacturer of hybrid cylindrical / prism based projection lenses specialized for the consumer home theater industry.
 Schneider Kreuznach, (also called Century Optics) are makers of anamorphic projection lenses. The company also manufactures add-on anamorphic adaptor lenses that can be mounted on digital video cameras.

Super 35 and Techniscope 

Although many films projected anamorphically have been shot using anamorphic lenses, there are often aesthetic and technical reasons that make shooting with spherical lenses preferable. If the director and cinematographer still wish to retain the 2.40:1 aspect ratio, anamorphic prints can be made from spherical negatives. Because the 2.40:1 image cropped from an Academy ratio 4-perf negative causes considerable waste of frame space, and since the cropping and anamorphosing of a spherical print requires an intermediate lab step, it is often attractive for these films to use a different negative pulldown method (most commonly 3-perf, but occasionally Techniscope 2-perf) usually in conjunction with the added negative space Super 35 affords.

However, with advancements in digital intermediate technology, the anamorphosing process can now be completed as a digital step with no degradation of image quality. Also, 3-perf and 2-perf pose minor problems for visual effects work. The area of the film in 4-perf work that is cropped out in the anamorphosing process nonetheless contains picture information that is useful for such visual effects tasks as 2D and 3D tracking. This mildly complicates certain visual effects efforts for productions using 3-perf and 2-perf, making anamorphic prints struck digitally from center cropped 4-perf Super 35 the popular choice in large budget visual effects driven productions.

See also 
 Arriscope
 Anamorphosis
 Aspect ratio
 Cine 160
 Letterbox
 List of film formats
 Pan and scan
 21:9 aspect ratio

References

External links 
 
 

American inventions
French inventions
Film and video technology
Motion picture film formats
Audiovisual introductions in 1953